Gustavo Cabrera may refer to:

Gustavo Cabrera Acevedo, Mexican demographer laureated with the National Prize for Demography (1981), member of Colegio Nacional (Mexico)
Gustavo Adolfo Cabrera, Guatemalan footballer